The Madison County Sheriff's House and Jail was a historic house and jail building located at 210 N. Main St. in Edwardsville, Illinois. Built in 1869 and opened in 1871, the building was the oldest Madison County government building in Edwardsville, the county seat. The building consisted of a three-story sheriff's house and an adjacent cell block; the cell block was expanded in 1904 to provide space for female prisoners. The sheriff's house was designed in the Second Empire style; it was one of two examples of the style in Edwardsville and the only one which had maintained its historical appearance. The building's design featured a mansard roof, two dormers on both the front and rear sides, and a bracketed wooden cornice.

The building was added to the National Register of Historic Places on May 31, 1980, and was delisted in 2020.

References

Jails on the National Register of Historic Places in Illinois
Second Empire architecture in Illinois
Government buildings completed in 1869
National Register of Historic Places in Madison County, Illinois
1869 establishments in Illinois
Jails in Illinois
Former National Register of Historic Places in Illinois